Recess is the debut studio album by American record producer Skrillex, released on March 14, 2014, by Owsla, Big Beat Records, and Atlantic Records. It was recorded between 2013 and 2014 whilst Skrillex was touring around the world.

Recess received mixed reviews from music critics. It charted in multiple countries worldwide and became his highest-charting release in the United States and the United Kingdom. Rolling Stone later ranked it at number 22 on their 50 Best Albums of 2014 list.

Marketing

Promotion
On March 7, 2014, Skrillex took part in an "ask me anything" online Reddit post. To coincide with this question-and-answer session, his website was changed to redirect to a page featuring a talking alien face, based on the Apple emoji. "The face played short samples from album tracks when you clicked it." He released a mobile app, Alien Ride, on the same day which features an arcade-style objective where the spaceship has to destroy asteroids. The app displayed a countdown.

When the countdown reached zero, the first song from the album was available to stream through the app. This continued in regular 30 minute intervals until the entire album was streamable for a limited time via the app.

Singles

"Try It Out (Neon Mix)" with Alvin Risk was released as the album's lead single on October 14, 2013, alongside two more mixes of the song. It charted in France at number 185. The title track, "Recess", was added to BBC Radio 1's C-List on March 19, 2014, and entered several countries' iTunes charts including the United States and United Kingdom. The song entered the UK Singles Chart at number 57 upon album release, and was released as a single alongside remixes on July 7, 2014. "Ease My Mind", "All Is Fair in Love and Brostep" and "Dirty Vibe" also entered the iTunes charts in various countries.

The music video for "Ragga Bomb" was released on April 1, 2014 and the song entered the Flanders Ultratip 100 at number 75. A remix EP entitled Ease My Mind v Ragga Bomb Remixes was released on November 24, 2014, with both songs doubling up as the single. "Dirty Vibe" was released as the album's fourth single in the form of another remix EP on December 15, 2014.

Other songs
"Doompy Poomp" was released on June 8, 2013, in collaboration with graphic designer Mishka for free download through his website. "Stranger" features on the Divergent soundtrack, released shortly before the album.
The first song, "All Is Fair in Love and Brostep" debuted as a demo on his BBC Radio 1 Essential Mix. The song "Terror Squad" by electronic music producer Zomboy was inspired by the demo version known officially as "untitled DJ tool" or unofficially as "This Much Power". As a result, Skrillex used a sample from "Terror Squad" that says "It's fucking Zomboy", covering up the "Zomboy" with a distorted and pitched down laugh.

Critical reception

At Metacritic, which assigns a normalized rating out of 100 to reviews from mainstream critics, the album has received an average score of 59 based on 15 reviews indicating "mixed or average reviews".

Commercial performance
The album debuted at number four on the US Billboard 200 chart, with first week sales of 48,000 copies in the United States. As of January 2015, it has sold 150,000 copies.

Track listing

Notes
"Coast Is Clear" features additional vocals by Peter Cottontale and Donnie Trumpet.

Sample credits
"All Is Fair in Love and Brostep" contains samples from "Terror Squad", written and performed by Zomboy.
"Coast Is Clear" contains interpolations of "Big Poppa", written and performed by The Notorious B.I.G.
"Ease My Mind" contains samples of "DJ, Ease My Mind", written and performed by Niki & The Dove.

Charts

Weekly charts

Year-end charts

Release history

References

2014 debut albums
Skrillex albums
Big Beat Records (American record label) albums
Owsla albums